Muhaned Altaher() born December 3, 1984) is a Sudanese footballer. He currently plays as a AM for the Sudanese Premier League club Tuti SC and the Sudanese national team. He has been one of the most talented players in Sudan.

Altaher was transferred from Al-Merghani of Kassala in 2004. He is good in free-kicks and dribbling with pace. His shot power is very powerful and dangerous with his left foot.

The fans call him Al-Ghezal, which means "the deer" in Arabic. He wears the number 10 shirt for Al-Hilal. He caught the eyes of many scouts during the 2012 African Cup of Nations as he played an important role, assisting goals for the team during the tournament.

International goals

References

External links
 
 

1984 births
Living people
Sudanese footballers
Sudan international footballers
2008 Africa Cup of Nations players
2011 African Nations Championship players
2012 Africa Cup of Nations players
Association football forwards
Al-Hilal Club (Omdurman) players
People from Kassala (state)
El Hilal SC El Obeid players
Sudan A' international footballers
2018 African Nations Championship players